Route 19 is a minor Connecticut state route running from Stafford to the Massachusetts state line. The road interconnects the settlements in the eastern part of the town.

Route description
Route 19 begins as East Street at an intersection with Route 190 in the village of Stafford Springs. Route 19 then heads northeast for another , passing through the village of Hydeville, up to the village of Staffordville. In Staffordville, Route 19 turns north along Wales Road, passing along the Staffordville Reservoir towards the Massachusetts state line. Across the state line the road continues as Massachusetts Route 19 (Stafford Road) heading into the town center of Wales. Route 19 is a two-lane road with an average daily traffic of 3,800.

History 

Route 19 was originally part of New England Interstate Route 32, a multi-state route established in 1922 that ran from the mouth of the Thames River at Long Island Sound to Lake Sunapee in New Hampshire. In the 1932 state highway renumbering, modern Route 32 was established from most of the Connecticut portion of the old New England route. One place where the alignment of modern Route 32 differed was in the town of Stafford. The newly established Route 32 used the alignment of old State Highway 334, which ran through the village of Orcuttsville towards Monson, Massachusetts. The section of old Route 32 through Staffordville was designated as Route 19. The number change was done in cooperation with Massachusetts, which also renumbered the continuation as Route 19.

Junction list

References

External links

019
Transportation in Tolland County, Connecticut